The governor of Montreal was the highest position in Montreal in the 17th century and the 18th century. Prior to the establishment of the 1663 Sovereign Council, the governor of Montreal was appointed by the Société Notre-Dame de Montréal. The governor had responsibilities over both military and civil affairs in Montreal.

List of governors of Montreal 
This is a list of governors of Montreal.

See also 

 Governor General of New France
 Governor of Acadia
 Governor of Plaisance
 Governor of Louisiana
 Timeline of Montreal history
 History of Montreal
 List of mayors of Montreal

References 

  Chronologie des gouverneurs de Montréal, 1641-1724, in Groupe de recherche sur Montréal, Centre Canadien d'Architecture 1996-2000
  Les Gouverneurs de Montréal, 1641 à 1724, in GenWeb Montréal, Ancêtre francophone

History of Montreal
Governors of New France